Nihar may refer to

 Nihar Ameen, Indian swimming coach.
 Nihar Mukherjee, Indian politician.
 Nihar Ranjan Gupta, Indian dermatologist and novelist.
 Nihar Ranjan Laskar, Indian politician.

Indian masculine given names